Ali Ibrahim (born 1 September 1969), known as Ali Ibrahim Pelé, is a former Ghanaian footballer. He played mainly as a striker, but also appeared as a midfielder.

Club career
Ibrahim started his football career at hometown club Great Olympics before moving to Germany in 1990 to join Bundesliga newcomers SG Wattenscheid 09, staying the four seasons that the club played in the top flight. After relegation, he moved to Swiss club FC Winterthur and Grasshoppers one season later, winning the 1995–96 Nationalliga A.

In 1996, he switched countries again, this time to Dutch club De Graafschap, staying for two seasons. In Netherlands, he gained notoriety after hitting the crossbar when trying a rabona scorpion kick in a match against Ajax. He left the club in 1998 and had a period as a journeyman playing in Belgium for K.R.C. Zuid-West-Vlaanderen, Gaziantepspor in Turkey, returning to Germany at SC Paderborn 07 and Venezuelan Caracas FC. After his spell in South America, he then returned to Netherlands where he finished his career at amateur football clubs SV Babberich and DSC Zevenaar.

International career
Ibrahim was first called to the Ghana national football team in 1991, but only debuting one year later. He was part of the Ghanaian squad that finished as runners-up in the 1992 African Cup of Nations.

References

External links

1969 births
Living people
Ghanaian footballers
Ghana international footballers
People from Accra
1992 African Cup of Nations players
Expatriate footballers in Germany
Expatriate footballers in Switzerland
Bundesliga players
Ghanaian expatriate footballers
Ghanaian expatriate sportspeople in Germany
Ghanaian expatriate sportspeople in Switzerland
Association football forwards
K.R.C. Zuid-West-Vlaanderen players